The Popescu Prize is a biennial poetry award established in 1983. It is given by the Poetry Society for a volume of poetry translated from a European language into English. Formerly called the European Poetry Translation Prize (1983–1997), the prize was relaunched in 2003, renamed in memory of the Romanian translator Corneliu M. Popescu, who died at age 19 in 1977 and was known as the Corneliu M Popescu Prize that year and in 2005. Popescu translated the work of one of Romania's leading poets, Mihai Eminescu, into English. The prize of £1,500 is awarded to a translator. Financial support has been provided by the Ratiu Foundation since 2003 (the Foundation was established in London in 1979 by Ion and Elisabeth Ratiu to promote and support projects which further education and research in the culture and history of Romania).

The Encyclopedia of Literary Translation into English (2000) considered the European Poetry Translation Prize one of the most "prestigious" translation awards.

European Poetry Translation Prize
Source:

1983: The Oresteia, Tony Harrison
1985: Michael Hamburger
1987: Ewald Osers
1989: David Luke
1991: Francis R. Jones 
1993: Paul Lawton
1995: George Szirtes
1997: David Constantine and Francis K. Jones

Popescu Prize
 2003: David Constantine for translation of Lighter than Air by Hans Magnus Enzensberger
 2005: Adam J. Sorkin & Lidia Vianu for translation of The Bridge by Marin Sorescu
 2007: Ilmar Lehtpere for translation of The Drums of Silence by Kristiina Ehin
 2009: Randall Couch for translation of Madwomen by Gabriela Mistral
 2011: Judith Wilkinson for translation of Raptors by Toon Tellegen
 2013: Alice Oswald, for Memorial, based on the Illiad by Homer
 2015: Iain Galbraith for translation of Self-Portrait with a Swarm of Bees by Jan Wagner
The award has not been run since 2015.

References

External links
Popescu Prize, official website

Awards established in 1983
Awards established in 2003
1983 establishments in the United Kingdom
2003 establishments in the United Kingdom
British poetry awards
Translation awards